Zabol University of Medical Sciences (Danushgah-e 'lum-e Pezeshki-ye vâ Xedâmat-e Behedashti-ye Dârmati-ye Zabel) is a public university in Zabol, Iran. The University has five faculties including medicine, pharmacy, health care, nursing, and paramedicine.

References

External links
 "Official Website of the Zabol University of Medical Sciences"

Zabol, University of Medical Sciences
Zabol, University of Medical Sciences
Education in Sistan and Baluchestan Province
Buildings and structures in Sistan and Baluchestan Province
1991 establishments in Iran